Privacy Center is a form of scareware that hijacks Microsoft Windows operating systems. It masquerades as a spyware remover, performs fake system scans to report (fake) infections and persuades the user to purchase the "full version" of Privacy Center to remove the reported infections and to protect the PC from future infections. It appears as a green system tray icon that often takes over the screen and blocks the desktop, including the start icon. Unlike other rogue anti-viruses, Privacy Center has the capability of running in safe mode. Attempts to close the system tray are futile. Also, the system will often not acknowledge the insertion of a USB flash drive.

Method of Infection
The virus is installed when users click on a fake video codec that is "required" to play an online "movie". Once a user clicks on the codec, Privacy Center will be installed as opposed to the video playing. It may also get installed when users click on some scripts in rogue security software sites. In August 2009, it was reported that Privacy Center can embed itself in another rogue anti-virus called PC AntiSpyware 2010.

References

Rogue software